Kharrat Mahalleh (also Romanized as Kharrāţ Maḩalleh) is a village in Divshal Rural District, in the Central District of Langarud County, Gilan Province, Iran. At the 2006 census, its population was 163, in 43 families.

References 

Populated places in Langarud County